Livin' with the Blues is a compilation album by American folk singer Odetta, originally released in 2000.

The focus of the material are the songs Odetta performed when recording for the Vanguard label. Most of them are taken from the albums Odetta at Town Hall, My Eyes Have Seen, and One Grain of Sand, along with a few rarities.

Track listing
All songs Traditional unless otherwise noted.
"Make Me a Pallet on the Floor" – 3:25
"Mean and Evil" – 2:24
"Livin' With the Blues" – 3:42
"Nobody Knows You When You're Down and Out" (Cox) – 2:15
"House of the Rising Sun" – 3:18
"Empty Pocket Blues" – 2:24
"Fare Thee Well" – 4:22
"Rosie" – 2:28
"Special Delivery Blues" – 2:41
"Down on Me" –  2:59
"Another Man Done Gone" (Hall, Alan Lomax, Lomax, Tartt) – 2:34
"Jumpin' Judy" – 2:30
"Timber" – 3:27
"Rambler Gambler" – 3:21
"Sail Away Ladies" – 2:45
"Midnight Special" – 3:25
"Rambling Round Your City" (Woody Guthrie) – 4:04
"Bald Headed Woman" – 2:23
"Ain't No Grave" – 2:22
"Roll on Buddy" – 3:00

Personnel
Odetta – vocals, guitar
Bill Lee – bass
Milt Okun – choir conductor

References

Odetta compilation albums
2000 compilation albums
Vanguard Records compilation albums